Wandering River is a hamlet in Alberta, Canada within Athabasca County.

Demographics 
Wandering River recorded a population of 63 in the 1991 Census of Population conducted by Statistics Canada.

Services and amenities 

The community has a number of hotels and motels, a service station, a school and formerly, a post office. The area also has several amenities including a skating and curling rink, a community hall, a senior's centre and a golf course.

See also 
List of communities in Alberta
List of hamlets in Alberta

References

External links 
Tourism

Athabasca County
Hamlets in Alberta